Chace Community School is a coeducational secondary school and sixth form located in Forty Hill, Enfield Town, England. It is situated on Churchbury Lane with its fields backing on to Baker Street. Chace is spelled with a 'c' rather than a 's', despite the school being close to the Chase Side area of Enfield. The school logo is the Enfield (the same as the London Borough of Enfield logo). Its colours are black and red.

Houses
Until September 2003, the school had four houses, named after four local large estates. These are listed below with the house colour in brackets.
 Capel (red) named after Capel Manor. Now the home of Capel Manor College for agricultural related studies
 Myddelton (green) named after Myddelton House. Now the home of Myddelton House Gardens
 Trent (blue) named after Trent Park|Trent House. Now within Middlesex University
 Whitewebbs (yellow) named after Whitewebbs House. Now a Toby Carvery pub.

Performance

GCSE level (Key Stage 4)
The school is in the top half of the Enfield league table with 89% achieving 5 GCSEs at grade C or above in 2009.. In 2008, 44% achieved 5 GCSEs at Grade C or above (including Maths and English).Chace Community School

A Level (Key Stage 5)
In 2005, the average UCAS points score was 211.5 per student, equivalent to 3 grade B at A Level.

QCA Points

In 2006 the average points score per examination entry was 235.5, equivalent to just under a grade B at A level.Chace Community School

In 2007 the average points score per examination entry was 242.8, equivalent to just over a grade B at A level.Chace Community School

In 2008 the average points score per examination entry was 278.3, equivalent to just under a grade A at A Level.Chace Community School

Headteachers
 Current: Tanya Douglas
 Past: Mrs Hill, Mr Higgins, Sue Warrington, Daniel Bruton

Notable former pupils

 Will Antwi, Anglo-Ghanaian footballer
 Bambos Charalambous (born 1967), Labour Party MP for Enfield Southgate
 Malcolm Needs, screenwriter
 Michelle Ryan, actress, best known for Zoe Slater in EastEnders
 Paul Whitehouse, comedian and actor
 John Wilson, angling writer and broadcaster.

References

External links 
 
 Key stage 4 Current performance according to Department for Education and Skills
 Key stage 5 Current performance according to Department for Education and Skills
 View from Google Maps
 EduBase

Enfield, London
Secondary schools in the London Borough of Enfield
Educational institutions established in 1956
Community schools in the London Borough of Enfield
People educated at Chace Community School
1956 establishments in England